Enes Rujović (born 29 May 1989) is a Slovenian football midfielder who plays for Ilirija 1911 in the Slovenian Second League.

Club career
Born in Ljubljana, he started his career in youth selections of Olimpija. He was later transferred to city rival Interblock, where he stayed for two seasons, playing 16 games. In the 2008–09 season, he was loaned to Livar, where he played 14 games and scored 5 goals. Before the 2009–10 season he joined Olimpija Ljubljana.

International career
He made his debut for Slovenia U21 in a friendly match against Bosnia and Herzegovina U21, which took place on 11 August 2009. He played in the second half of the match.

References

External links

Player profile at PrvaLiga 

1989 births
Living people
Footballers from Ljubljana
Slovenian footballers
Association football midfielders
Slovenia under-21 international footballers
Slovenian expatriate footballers
Slovenian expatriate sportspeople in Cyprus
Slovenian expatriate sportspeople in Greece
Expatriate footballers in Cyprus
Expatriate footballers in Greece
Slovenian PrvaLiga players
Slovenian Second League players
Cypriot First Division players
NK Olimpija Ljubljana (2005) players
NK IB 1975 Ljubljana players
NK Ivančna Gorica players
NK Triglav Kranj players
Nea Salamis Famagusta FC players
A.P.S. Zakynthos players
NK Krško players
NK Krka players
NK Drava Ptuj (2004) players
ND Ilirija 1911 players
Slovenia youth international footballers